Rags to Riches is an American musical comedy drama that was broadcast on NBC for two seasons from March 9, 1987, to January 15, 1988. Set in the pre-British Invasion 1960s, the series tells the story of Nick Foley, a self-made millionaire who adopts six orphan girls. Each episode included musical scenes of hit songs from the era performed by the girls integrated into the plot (with the lyrics modified to provide commentary on the storyline).

Plot
Nick Foley (Joseph Bologna), the millionaire owner of Foley Foods, is a streetwise New Jersey-born businessman who realizes that his playboy lifestyle has been a liability for his business reputation. In the TV movie pilot that launched the series, Foley attempts to develop a family man image by bringing a group of six orphaned girls, who were featured in a newspaper story saying that they refused to be separated from each other, to live in the mansion in Bel Air where he lives with his butler, John Clapper (Douglas Seale). Foley does this to seal a business deal and does not intend to keep the girls permanently, but Foley's plans change as he grows attached to the girls, and he ends up adopting them as his legal daughters.

The adjustment is huge on both sides, as the girls acquire a new father with no parenting experience. Having spent the past few years in a rundown orphanage, the girls suddenly find themselves in a life of luxury (hence the series' title). The series follows the trials and tribulations of the girls and a man who has previously never loved anyone but himself, and often struggles to cope with his new family.

In the pilot for the series, Foley takes in a group of six girls; however, Foley only adopted five of them for the remainder of the series' run: Rose, 17; Diane, 16;  Marva, 15; Patty, 13; and Mickey, 7. The sixth girl, Nina, appears only in the pilot (after the pilot was produced, it was decided that six children was too many for the series cast, so Nina was written out of the series as having been reunited with her birth mother as referenced in the episode "Patty's Mom").

The series differed from regular comedy dramas in that the girls would frequently burst into song to help explain their feelings or move along the plot. Each episode therefore contained at least two musical scenes with covers of popular songs from the early 1960s with the lyrics changed to provide commentary on the storyline of the episode.

Reception
Promoted with the tagline, "If you liked Annie, you'll like Rags to Riches". After very good ratings on Sunday night, it got moved to Friday in the fall of 1987 to make way for Family Ties.  Ratings for the series were not strong enough for its Friday night time slot, and NBC canceled the show part way through its second season.

Musical numbers
Mark Mueller wrote new comedic lyrics for existing hit songs from the '50s and early '60s that were featured in most episodes of both seasons of the show. He also wrote the lyrics to the show's theme song. Many of the songs used were not around yet during the time frame when the series takes place; 1961-63.

Cast and characters

Main cast
 Joseph Bologna as Nick Foley
 Tisha Campbell as Marva
 Blanca De Garr as Patty
 Kimiko Gelman as Rose
 Bridget Michele as Diane 
 Heidi Zeigler as Mickey
 Douglas Seale as John Clapper

Recurring cast
 Heather McAdam as Nina
 Sarah Buxton as Amy Hillerman
 Sue Ball as Marnie
 Jeff Harlan as Marty
 John Christy Ewing as Mr. Donovan
 Sandy Ward as Al Schweikert

Episodes

Season 1 (1987)

Season 2 (1987–88)

Home media
On June 5, 2012, Image Entertainment released Rags to Riches: The Complete Series on Region 1 DVD.

DTP Entertainment released the entire series on DVD in Germany. Season 1 was released on May 13, 2011, and season 2 on October 27, 2011.

Awards and nominations

References

External links

1987 American television series debuts
1988 American television series endings
1980s American comedy-drama television series
1980s American musical comedy television series
1980s American teen drama television series
English-language television shows
NBC original programming
Period television series
Television series about orphans
Television series about teenagers
Television series by 20th Century Fox Television
Television series by New World Television
Television series set in the 1960s
Television shows set in California
Television series about adoption